Canadian Amateurs or variation, may refer to:

Sports
An "Amateur" (type of tournament):
 Canadian Amateur Championship (golf), men's golf tournament
 Canadian Women's Amateur (golf), women's golf tournament
 Canadian Amateur Championship (snooker)

Other uses
 The Canadian Amateur (TCA), amateur radio magazine

See also

 Canada Cup (disambiguation)
 Canadian Open (disambiguation)
 Canadian Masters (disambiguation)
 Canadian Championships (disambiguation)

 Amateur Hockey Association of Canada (1886-1898)
 Canadian Amateur Hockey League (1898-1905)
 Eastern Canada Amateur Hockey Association (1905-1909)
 Canadian Amateur Hockey Association (1914-1994) governing body of amateur ice hockey
 
 
 
 Canadian (disambiguation)
 Amateur (disambiguation)